2AAA (also known as FM107.1 2AAA) is a community radio station operated by Wagga Wagga Community Media Incorporated in Wagga Wagga, New South Wales, Australia broadcasting on FM 107.1 MHz.

The station was officially opened on 31 July 1981 and celebrated 25 years of continuous broadcasting in 2006.

References

Community radio stations in Australia
Radio stations in Wagga Wagga
Radio stations established in 1981